Citharichthys xanthostigma, the longfin sanddab, is a species of flatfish in the large-tooth flounder family Paralichthyidae. It is native to the eastern Pacific Ocean, in subtropical waters ranging from Monterey Bay, California in the north, to Costa Rica in the south.

Like the rest of the large-tooth flounders, it has both eyes on the left side of its head. It is brown-colored, with white and orange speckles. Citharichthys xanthostigma is a predator, feeding on benthic worms and crustaceans.

It shares its habitat with the larger Pacific sanddab (C. sordidus), and is a game fish of minor commercial importance.

References

Citharichthys
Fish of the Pacific Ocean
Fish described in 1890